Navy Midshipmen basketball may refer to either of the basketball teams that represent the United States Naval Academy:
Navy Midshipmen men's basketball
Navy Midshipmen women's basketball